Kolosova is a village in Western Ukraine. Administratively it is part of Kremenets Raion of the Ternopil Oblast. It belongs to Kremenets urban hromada, one of the hromadas of Ukraine.

References

Villages in Kremenets Raion